The 2014 Mekong Club Championship was the inaugural season of the Mekong Club Championship. Four teams from the respective domestic league winners from Cambodia, Laos, Myanmar and Vietnam competed. The inaugural championship was in Vietnam from 31 October 2014 and 2 November and played on a knockout basis starting from the semi-finals stage. The championship is sponsored by Toyota.

Qualified teams

Venues

Knockout stage

Bracket

Semi-finals

3rd place playoff

Final

Winners

Goalscorers

3 goals
  George Bisan

2 goals
  Nguyễn Anh Đức
  Ganiyu Oseni

1 goals
  Shim Un-seob
  Phonepaseuth Sysoutham
  Abass Cheikh Dieng
  Nguyễn Trọng Hoàng
  Koen Bosma
  Lê Công Vinh
  Nguyễn Tăng Tuấn
  Thiha Zaw
  Nguyễn Anh Đức
  Lê Tấn Tài

References

External links
 Official site

2014
2014
2014 in Vietnamese football
2014 in Burmese football
2014 in Laotian football
2014 in Cambodian football